Vincent-Paul Lavallée (March 27, 1839 – October 15, 1931) was a physician and political figure in Quebec. He represented Joliette in the Legislative Assembly of Quebec from 1867 to 1885 as a Conservative member.

He was born in Berthier-en-Haut, Lower Canada, the son of Paul Lavallée and Marie Laférière. Lavallée was educated at the Collège de Berthier and the École de médecine et de chirurgie at Montreal, qualified to practise medicine in 1860 and set up practice in Saint-Félix-de-Valois. He was also commissioner for the trial of small causes. He was married twice: to Henriette Chalut in 1861 and to Élie Crépeau in 1870. In 1885, he was named to the Legislative Council of Quebec for Lanaudière division, serving until 1888. Lavallée was an unsuccessful candidate for a seat in the House of Commons in 1896.

References 
 

1837 births
1902 deaths
Conservative Party of Quebec MNAs
Conservative Party of Quebec MLCs
Conservative Party of Canada (1867–1942) candidates for the Canadian House of Commons
People from Lanaudière